This is a list of members of the National Parliament of Papua New Guinea from 1982 to 1987, as elected at the 1982 election.

Notes

References

List
Papua New Guinea politics-related lists